A buckle is a clasp used for fastening two things together.

Buckle or Buckles may also  refer to:

Places
Buckle Island, in the Southern Ocean
Buckles, Virginia

People with the name
Buckle (surname)
Bradley A. Buckles (born 1949), American lawyer and ATF Director
Frank Buckles (1901–2011), last surviving American military veteran of World War I
Rakeem Buckles (born 1990), American professional basketball player in the Israeli Basketball Premier League

Arts, entertainment, and media
Buckle, a character from the American Dad episode, "An Apocalypse to Remember", 
Buckles (comics), a comic strip by David Gilbert about the misadventures of the eponymous anthropomorphic dog

Other uses
Buckle (casting), a type of casting defect
Buckle (clothing retailer)
Buckle, a type of cobbler (food) used as a dessert
Buckle, the bottom part of a blimp
Buckle Sports Coupe, an automobile produced in Australia from 1956 to 1960

See also
Buccal (disambiguation)
Buckling (disambiguation)